Harnhill is a village and former civil parish now in the parish of Driffield, in the Cotswold district, in the county of Gloucestershire, England. It is about  miles from the town of Cirencester. In 1931 the parish had a population of 74. Harnhill has a church called St Michaels Church which is grade II* listed, the Harnhill Centre of Christian Healing is north of the village.

History 
The name origin of "Harnhill" is uncertain and may mean 'Grey hill' or perhaps, 'hares' hill'. Harnhill was recorded in the Domesday Book as Harehille. On 1 April 1935 the parish was abolished and merged with Driffield.

References 

Villages in Gloucestershire
Former civil parishes in Gloucestershire
Cotswold District